Marcus Brady (born September 24, 1979) is an American football coach who is the senior offensive assistant for the Philadelphia Eagles of the National Football League (NFL). He previously served as the offensive coordinator for the Indianapolis Colts from 2021 to 2022 and also served as an assistant coach for the Toronto Argonauts and Montreal Alouettes.

He played college football at California State University, Northridge and in 2002 was signed as an undrafted free agent by the Toronto Argonauts of the Canadian Football League (CFL). Brady played for seven seasons in the CFL for the Toronto Argonauts, Hamilton Tiger-Cats and Montreal Alouettes.

Playing career

College
Brady attended Cal State Northridge as a business major, where he started 43 straight games. He held his school's all-time lead for completions (1,036), attempts (1,677), yards (12,445) and touchdowns (109).

Canadian Football League

Toronto Argonauts
In 2002, Brady signed with the Toronto Argonauts as an undrafted free agent. He played with the Argonauts for two seasons.

Hamilton Tiger-Cats
In 2004, Brady was signed by the Hamilton Tiger-Cats and played for two seasons with the team.

Montreal Alouettes
In 2006, Brady was acquired and signed by the Montreal Alouettes as a free agent. He backed up starter Anthony Calvillo and was used primarily for short yardage situations. He also punted for the Alouettes in place of Damon Duval. He retired on April 2, 2009.

Coaching career

Montreal Alouettes
Following his retirement as a football player, Brady began his coaching career and was hired by the Montreal Alouettes, his former team, to serve as their wide receivers coach in 2009. Following the departure of Scott Milanovich, Brady was promoted to offensive coordinator on December 4, 2011.

Toronto Argonauts
On December 3, 2012, Brady was hired to be the offensive coordinator of the Toronto Argonauts.

Indianapolis Colts
In 2018, Brady was hired by the Indianapolis Colts as their assistant quarterbacks coach under head coach Frank Reich. In 2019, Brady was promoted to quarterbacks coach. On January 25, 2021, Brady was promoted to offensive coordinator, replacing Nick Sirianni, who departed to become head coach of the Philadelphia Eagles. He was fired by the Indianapolis Colts on November 1, 2022, as Offensive Coordinator.

Philadelphia Eagles 
On November 22, 2022, ESPN reported that Brady had been hired by the Philadelphia Eagles as an offensive consultant.

On February 28, 2023, Brady was hired by the Philadelphia Eagles as a senior offensive assistant under head coach Nick Sirianni.

Personal life
Brady is married to his wife, Sherrie, and together they have a daughter, Saliyah, and a son, Aaden. Brady played basketball and baseball at Samuel F. B. Morse High School in San Diego.

References

External links
 Indianapolis Colts profile
Toronto Argonauts profile

1979 births
Living people
African-American players of American football
African-American players of Canadian football
American football punters
American football quarterbacks
Cal State Northridge Matadors football players
Canadian football punters
Canadian football quarterbacks
Green Bay Packers players
Hamilton Tiger-Cats players
Indianapolis Colts coaches
Montreal Alouettes coaches
Montreal Alouettes players
National Football League offensive coordinators
Philadelphia Eagles coaches
Players of American football from San Diego
Players of Canadian football from San Diego
Toronto Argonauts coaches
Toronto Argonauts players